Lee Clark may refer to:

 Lee Clark (footballer) (born 1972), former English footballer and manager
 Lee Clark (politician) (1936–2008), Canadian Member of Parliament from Manitoba
 Lee Anna Clark, professor in the department of psychology at the University of Iowa
 Lee Clark (The Amazing Spiez!) , a character on the animation series The Amazing Spiez!
 Lee Clark, television presenter, ex-husband of Pollyanna Woodward

See also
 Lee Clarke (born 1983), English footballer for St. Alban's City